Hahamakin ang Lahat (International title: Love and Defiance / ) is a Philippine television drama romance series broadcast by GMA Network. It aired from October 31, 2016 to February 17, 2017 on the network's Afternoon Prime line up replacing Sinungaling Mong Puso and worldwide on GMA Pinoy TV.

Urban Luzon and NUTAM (Nationwide Urban Television Audience Measurement) ratings are provided by AGB Nielsen Philippines.

Series overview

Episodes

October 2016

November 2016

December 2016

January 2017

February 2017

References

Lists of Philippine drama television series episodes